The Killing Fields is the 10th record album by Mike Oldfield, released on 26 November 1984 by Virgin Records in the UK. It was the soundtrack album for the British drama film of the same name based on the experiences of two journalists in the Khmer Rouge regime in Cambodia. It is the only full-length film score written by Oldfield.

The music was orchestrated by David Bedford. The Killing Fields was re-released in a remastered edition format on 29 January 2016, as per all previous albums which were originally released on the Virgin label.

History 
Though Oldfield's music had been used in films before (see The Exorcist and The Space Movie), this was the first time he had written specifically for film, and so far the only time.  Oldfield composed the album on a Fairlight CMI.

Like many soundtracks, the album is not a comprehensive record of all the Oldfield music used in the film. Most notably, the music accompanying the darkroom sequence does not feature on the album.  The single from the album, "Étude", is taken from the Francisco Tarrega piece "Recuerdos de la Alhambra".

Oldfield's work on the score was partially instigated by Virgin boss Richard Branson when he took Oldfield to see David Puttnam, a producer on the film, which then secured him the role.

Oldfield spent six months working on the score for The Killing Fields before going on tour, but when Oldfield returned, the producers of the film asked for more music to be written, prompting Oldfield to ask for the use of an orchestra and a choir; three months later the score was finished. It was released just a few months after Oldfield's previous album, Discovery.

In Canada, the album reached #90 in the Top Album charts.

Track listing 
All tracks written by Mike Oldfield, except where stated.

Side one 
 "Pran's Theme" – 0:44
 "Requiem for a City" – 2:11
 "Evacuation" – 5:14
 "Pran's Theme 2" – 1:41
 "Capture" – 2:24
 "Execution" – 4:47
 "Bad News" – 1:14
 "Pran's Departure" – 2:08

Side two 
 "Worksite" – 1:16
 "The Year Zero" – 0:28 (David Bedford)
 "Blood Sucking" – 1:19
 "The Year Zero 2" – 0:37
 "Pran's Escape" / "The Killing Fields" – 3:17
 "The Trek" – 2:02
 "The Boy's Burial" / "Pran Sees the Red Cross" – 2:24
 "Good News" – 1:46
 "Étude" – 4:37 (Francisco Tárrega, arranged by Mike Oldfield)

2016 remaster 
 "Pran's Theme"
 "Requiem for a City"
 "Evacuation"
 "Pran's Theme 2"
 "Capture"
 "Execution"
 "Bad News"
 "Pran's Departure"
 "Worksite"
 "The Year Zero"
 "Blood Sucking"
 "The Year Zero 2"
 "Pran's Escape" / "The Killing Fields"
 "The Trek"
 "The Boy's Burial" / "Pran Sees the Red Cross"
 "Good News"
 "Étude"
 "Evacuation (Single edit)" (Bonus track)
 "Étude (Single edit)" (Bonus track)

Personnel 
 Mike Oldfield – guitars (Gibson Les Paul Junior and SG Junior), synthesizers (including Sequential Circuits Prophet 5, Oberheim OB-Xa, DMX, and Roland VP-330), Fairlight CMI, producer, engineer
 Preston Heyman – oriental percussion
 Morris Pert – percussion
 Eberhard Schoener – conductor
 Bavarian State Orchestra
 Tölzer Boys Choir

Certifications

References

External links 
 Mike Oldfield Discography - The Killing Fields at Tubular.net

Works about the Cambodian genocide
Mike Oldfield albums
Killing Fields
1984 soundtrack albums
Virgin Records soundtracks
Biographical film soundtracks
Drama film soundtracks